The Columbia Human Rights Law Review is a law review established in 1967 focusing on human rights issues. Named the Columbia Survey of Human Rights Law for its first three volumes, the journal is produced and edited by students of Columbia Law School and is "dedicated to the analysis and discussion of human rights and civil liberties under both domestic and international law." In 2016, the journal launched HRLR Online, an online publication featuring shorter, cutting-edge pieces focusing on human rights.

Content 
The journal has published Justice Ruth Bader Ginsburg, Archbishop Desmond Tutu, Amal Clooney, Judge Morris Lasker, Vernon Jordan, Michael Posner, Vilma Martínez, Jack Greenberg, Marian Wright Edelman, Justice Albie Sachs, Eben Moglen, Louis Henkin, Gerald Neuman, Jeremy Waldron, James Liebman, Harold Hongju Koh, Mary Robinson, Aaron Edward Brown, Fionnuala Ní Aoláin, Sarah Cleveland, and Chief Justice Arthur Chaskalson, among others. Ruth Bader Ginsburg and Louis Henkin also served as faculty advisors for the journal.

Rankings 
The journal is currently the highest-ranked human rights law journal in the world. Since 2006, it has been the most cited human rights law journal in the world.

A Jailhouse Lawyer's Manual 
Since 1978, the editors of the journal have also published A Jailhouse Lawyer's Manual.

Editors-in-chief 

 Namratha Somayajula (vol. 55, upcoming: 2023-2024)
 Olivia Martinez (vol. 54, 2022-present)
 Anahi Mendoza (vol. 53, 2021-2022)
 Caitlin Lowell (vol. 52, 2020-2021)
 Will Wilder (vol. 51, 2019-2020)
 Clarisa Reyes-Becerra (vol. 50, 2018-2019)
 Hanna L. St. Marie (vol. 49, 2017-2018)
 Julia Sherman (vol. 48, 2016-2017)
 Brian Yin (vol. 47, 2015-2016)
 Bassam Khawaja (vol. 46, 2014-2015)
 Ashley Starr Kinseth (vol. 45, 2013-2014)
 Gudrun Juffer (vol. 44, 2012-2013)
 Adam L. Shpeen (vol. 43, 2011-2012)
 Kinara A. Flagg (vol. 42, 2010-2011)
 Megan Crowley (vol. 41, 2009-2010)
 Teddy Nemeroff (vol. 40, 2008-2009)
 Beth Morales Singh (vol. 39, 2007-2008)
 Mary Kelly Persyn (vol. 38, 2006-2007)
 Brian Murphy (vol. 37, 2005-2006)
 Sarah Stewart (vol. 36, 2004-2005)
 Jennifer L. Co (vol. 35, 2003-2004)
 Lisa Howley (vol. 34, 2002-2003)
 Gretchen Borchelt (vol. 33, 2001-2002)
 Jennifer Arnett Lee (vol. 32, 2000-2001)
 Taryn A. Merkl (vol. 31, 1999-2000)
 Edward H. Smoot (vol. 30, 1998-1999)
 Farhad Karim (vol. 29, 1997-1998)
 Pamela J. Papish (vol. 28, 1996-1997)
 Jonathan S. Abernethy (vol. 27, 1995-1996)
 Anthony P. Ewing (vol. 26, 1994-1995)
 Michael D. Hintze (vol. 25, 1993-1994)
 Salomón Torres (vol. 24, 1992-1993)
 Ivan A. Sacks (vol. 23, 1991-1992)
 Jonathan E. Klaaren (vol. 22, 1990-1991)
 Theodore J. Piccone (vol. 21, 1989-1990)
 Ian Thomas Moar (vols. 19.2, 20.1, 1988-1989)
 Paul D. Leake (vols. 18.2, vol. 19.1, 1987-1988)
 Joseph A. Sullivan (vols. 17.2, 18.1, 1986-1987)
 Matthew H. Adler (vol. 13, 1981-1982)
 Holly Anne Clarke (vol. 12, 1980-1981)
 Regina L. Bryant (vol. 11, 1979-1980)
 Steven S. Tokarski (vol. 7, 1975-1976)
 Bruce M. Montgomerie (vol. 3, 1970-1971) (Columbia Survey of Human Rights Law)
 Marjorie A. McDiarmid (vol. 2, 1969-1970) (Columbia Survey of Human Rights Law)
 David M. Kairys (vol. 1, 1967-1968) (Columbia Survey of Human Rights Law)

References

American law journals
Columbia Law School
Human rights journals
Human rights in the United States
Law journals edited by students
Publications established in 1967
English-language journals
Triannual journals
Columbia University academic journals